End of Days is a 1999 American action horror film directed by Peter Hyams and starring Arnold Schwarzenegger, Gabriel Byrne, Robin Tunney, Kevin Pollak, Rod Steiger, CCH Pounder, Miriam Margolyes and Udo Kier. The film follows former New York Police Department detective Jericho Cane (Schwarzenegger) after he saves a banker (Byrne) from an assassin, finds himself embroiled in a religious conflict, and must protect an innocent young woman (Tunney) who is chosen by evil forces to conceive the Antichrist with Satan.

The film was released by Universal Pictures and by Buena Vista International on November 24, 1999. It has grossed $66.9 million in North America and $145.1 million elsewhere, for a worldwide total of $212 million. The film received largely negative reviews.

Plot

In 1979, the Pope sends a priest on a mission to protect a newborn baby, Christine York, identified in New York City by satanists as one chosen to be the mother of Satan's child. However, a few Vatican knights (led by a corrupt cardinal) insist that she must be killed.

In 1999, Satan possesses an investment banker. Alcoholic former NYPD detective Jericho Cane, depressed since his wife and daughter's contract killings, works for a private security company and blames God for his plight. Jericho and friend Bobby Chicago are assigned to protect the possessed banker. A priest, Thomas Aquinas, fails to kill the banker. Jericho captures Aquinas and, after hearing his ramblings, gives him to the New York City Police Department (NYPD). Marge Francis, an NYPD detective and Jericho's former colleague, tells Jericho that Aquinas has no tongue.

Jericho and Bobby investigate Aquinas' apartment, where they find his tongue in a jar and messages and symbols written in blood on the walls. Aquinas turns out to be trained by the Vatican and was sent to New York before disappearing. Jericho questions Father Kovak, a priest who knew Aquinas. Kovak responds in a vague and unsatisfying manner. Satan enters Aquinas' hospital, and crucifies him on the ceiling. After he is brought down and presumed dead, Jericho and Chicago read in Latin "Christ in New York" carved into his skin. They begin searching for any similar names and come across Christine York in her apartment.

Jericho and Chicago rescue her from being killed by the Vatican knights. However, Satan then appears and immolates Chicago. Jericho and Christine flee from him. Marge and another officer, both revealed to be Satanists, demand Jericho surrenders Christine. Jericho kills them both and escapes with Christine. Satan resurrects Marge to rally the other Satanists to do his bidding. Taking refuge in the church, Father Kovak tells Jericho and Christine that Satan must impregnate her by midnight on New Year's Eve to usher in the "end of days". Christine accepts Kovak's protection, and Jericho leaves her there.

Satan confronts Jericho in his apartment and tries to tempt him into giving up Christine in exchange for resurrecting his dead family. After Jericho resists his temptations, Chicago arrives at his apartment, and the two agree to retrieve Christine from the church.

Back at the church, Jericho stops the cardinal and his knights from killing Christine. Satan reappears and kills the Vatican clergy. Chicago betrays Jericho, leaving him to be beaten and crucified by a mob of Satanists, revealing that he made a pact with Satan in exchange for his resurrection. After Chicago leaves with Christine, Kovak finds and rescues Jericho. After his recovery, Jericho tracks down Satan to his lair, kills Marge once again and rescues Christine. In the ensuing fight, he convinces Chicago to resist Satan's influence. Satan later kills Chicago for breaking their pact. Jericho destroys the lair, escapes with Christine into a subway tunnel and boards a train. Satan follows them, killing the train's driver. Jericho fires another grenade, destroying the train car Satan was in. Satan abandons the banker's irreparably damaged body to pursue Jericho and Christine, leaving him to die.

Jericho and Christine arrive at another church, where he renews his faith in God and prays for strength. Satan as a massive, winged creature appears and possesses Jericho. Satan, now in Jericho's body, attempts to rape Christine. Responding to her pleas, Jericho is able to resist long enough to deliberately impale himself on a nearby sword, sacrificing himself to prevent Satan's endgame. At the stroke of midnight, Satan is sent back to hell. Jericho sees his wife and daughter waiting for him in the afterlife and dies peacefully. Christine tearfully embraces him as the world celebrates a new millennium.

Cast

Production
Directors Sam Raimi and Guillermo del Toro were offered End of Days, but turned it down due to other projects. Marcus Nispel was going to direct the film, but he left because of budget and script problems and was replaced by Peter Hyams.

The role of Jericho Cane was written for Tom Cruise, but he chose to work on Magnolia and Arnold Schwarzenegger was then cast in March 1998. Liv Tyler was the first choice for the role of Christine York, but she declined over contractual issues. Kate Winslet was then set to play the character, but she dropped out and Robin Tunney replaced her. According to Hyams,

Jim Cameron was the kind of godfather of me doing that film, because of his relationship with Schwarzenegger. He told me I was doing it! ... End Of Days was going to be Marcus Nispel, but it wasn't working somehow, but they had Arnold and a start date, and Jim came to me and told me I had to do it. This was the first picture Arnold had made for a couple of years. I think he had a heart thing. So this was Arnold coming back. And he wanted to try to make something good, and to take some chances. I applauded that. And we had very, very good actors around him, like Gabriel Byrne and Kevin Pollak and Rod Steiger. It was a very enjoyable experience. Half way through shooting I told Arnold I thought he should die in this movie. Of course Universal blanched at the idea, so I shot the ending both ways, and everybody agreed that the dying ending was the better one.

Over 60 visual effects shots were created by Rhythm & Hues.

As early as 2016, actress Miriam Margolyes had complained about Arnold Schwarzenegger's behavior on set. In 2022, Margolyes' reports caught wind again when she accused Arnold Schwarzenegger of deliberately farting in her face while on set. Schwarzenegger has yet to respond to the allegations.

Music

Soundtrack

The film's soundtrack primarily contains tracks by industrial rock and alternative metal bands. It features "Oh My God", the first song released by the "new line-up" of Guns N' Roses. During the editing of End of Days, soundtrack songs were overlaid in scenes that are usually silent in thriller films. In several scenes, a sample from Spectrasonics' "Symphony of Voices" is heard. The score for the film is composed by John Debney and conducted by Pete Anthony.

Release

Alternate ending
Jericho dies, and Christine tearfully embraces his body and thanks him for saving her life. Suddenly, God removes the sword from Jericho's body and heals his wounds, bringing him back to life. Christine is surprised and glad Jericho is back, and they embrace before leaving the church together.

Reception

Box office

End of Days opened on November 24, 1999, in third place behind Toy Story 2 and The World Is Not Enough. It earned $20.5 million in its opening weekend, combining with $31 million from its five-day Wednesday opening. The film grossed $66,889,043 in the United States and about $212 million worldwide, against a budget estimated at $100 million. Although it was profitable because of strong international revenue and DVD sales, its final numbers fell short of Universal Studios' expectations. Schwarzenegger received a salary of $25 million for his role in the film.

Critical response

End of Days received largely negative reviews. Rotten Tomatoes gives the film an approval rating of 11%, based on reviews from 101 critics. The site's consensus states: "An overblown thriller with formulaic action scenes and poor acting." Metacritic gives it an average score of 33/100, based on reviews from 33 critics. Audiences polled by CinemaScore gave the film an average grade of "B−" on an A+ to F scale.

Newsweek wrote that "Peter Hyams's lurid, FX-happy thriller slams pieces of a dozen other movies into a noxious new compound. It has to be seen to be believed, but who'd want to?" while Mark Kermode called it "idiotic beyond the point of redemption, this sinfully stupid farrago manages to insult audiences and critics, Christians and Satanists alike, reducing 2000 years of fertile mythology to the level of an incoherent pop video.". USA Today called Schwarzenegger's performance "among his worst" noting that he "seems to have trouble with his lines and doesn't get to make his trademark wisecracks". Los Angeles Times''' Eric Harrison called it "bloodless as a cyborg, and it feels as if it has been assembled according to diagrams supplied by someone who studied every successful sci-fi action thriller and then multiplied the findings by 10". The New York Times wrote that End of Days is "as incoherent about its mysticism as it is about anything else".

However, there were a few mixed reviews. San Francisco Chronicle stated that while "there are moments in End of Days when Schwarzenegger seems to be gunning for an Oscar. Those moments play like comic relief", "End of Days is an intense but silly thriller". James Berardinelli called it "a deliciously bad motion picture" while Roger Ebert stated that "End of Days involves a head-on collision between the ludicrous and the absurd" giving it two stars out of four. In a retrospective editorial twenty years since the film's release, Bloody Disgusting highlighted how the film "is always fascinating and entertaining".

Schwarzenegger later said he thought Hyams was "the wrong director" for the film. "He did not have the potential... I think visually and intellectually to really do something with that movie, but he was recommended by James Cameron, so we thought 'Well he must know.'"

AccoladesEnd of Days'' was nominated for three Razzie Awards—Worst Actor (Arnold Schwarzenegger), Worst Supporting Actor (Gabriel Byrne) and Worst Director (Peter Hyams)—and was pre-nominated for Worst Picture, but it was withdrawn shortly before the awards ceremony.

It also received a nomination from the Motion Picture Sound Editors for Best Sound Editing - Effects & Foley as well as two nominations in the Blockbuster Entertainment Awards for Favorite Actor - Action/Science Fiction and for Favorite Supporting Actor - Action/Science-Fiction for Arnold Schwarzenegger and Kevin Pollak respectively.

See also
 List of American films of 1999
 Arnold Schwarzenegger filmography

References

External links
 
 
  
 
 

1999 films
1999 action thriller films
1999 horror films
1990s supernatural horror films
1990s action horror films
American action thriller films
American supernatural horror films
Beacon Pictures films
Buena Vista International films
Apocalyptic films
Films about cults
Demons in film
American dystopian films
The Devil in film
1990s English-language films
Films about widowhood
Films directed by Peter Hyams
Films about the New York City Police Department
Films produced by Armyan Bernstein
Films scored by John Debney
Films set in 1979
Films set in 1999
Films set in New York City
Films set in Vatican City
Films set in religious buildings and structures
Films shot in Los Angeles
Films shot in New York City
Holiday horror films
Incest in film
Films set around New Year
Films about Satanism
Films about spirit possession
Religious action films
Universal Pictures films
American action horror films
1990s action films
1990s American films